Luis Robinson Rentería Cuesta is a Colombian retired footballer who played as striker. 
In 2016, his cousin Manuel Palacios died of stomach wounds after a group of assailants broke into Robinson's parents house.

Transfers

Estudiantes de Mérida

Left Trujillanos FC to Estudiantes de Mérida in 2007.

Anzoategui

Began playing with Deportivo Anzoátegui in the beginning of 2011.

Platinum Stars

Robinson signed with Platinum Stars F.C. leading up to the 2008-09 Premier Soccer League.

Career

Much earlier, in 2006-07 he was pronounced top scorer of the Venezuelan Apertura and Clausura by  virtue of scoring 19 goals; he was already leading as top scorer by late October 2006.

With Maritzburg United F.C. in the 2008-09 he scored 10 goals reminiscent of his high scoring tallies.

Personal life

Raised in Colombia, he had five siblings- two of whom followed his footsteps to a football player whereas the other three did academic jobs.

References

External links
 
 

1980 births
Living people
Colombian footballers
Colombian expatriate footballers
Expatriate footballers in China
Expatriate footballers in Venezuela
Expatriate footballers in Ecuador
Expatriate soccer players in South Africa
Venezuelan Primera División players
South African Premier Division players
Atlético Nacional footballers
Beijing Guoan F.C. players
Caracas FC players
Boyacá Chicó F.C. footballers
C.D. ESPOLI footballers
Maritzburg United F.C. players
Cortuluá footballers
Zamora FC players
Association football forwards
People from Quibdó
Sportspeople from Chocó Department